Joel Townsley Rogers (November 22, 1896 — October 1, 1984) was an American writer who wrote science fiction, air-adventure, and mystery stories and a handful of mystery novels.

Joel Townsley Rogers was born in 1896 in Sedalia, Missouri. He studied at Harvard University. He joined the navy air corps and became one of its first few hundred flyers. He went through training in Hampton Roads, Virginia.  The Great War seemed an adventure to the young men of that generation. Rogers was aching to go overseas, and in fact he managed to get himself in a position to do so, had the armistice not intervened. He was sent to Pensacola as a flight instructor instead. According to one of his letters, the planes he flew and taught others to fly were tiny pontooned biplanes made of spruce and linen.

After the war he made use of his experiences and vivid imagination to sell short stories to the many pulp magazines that sold in the 1920s and 1930s for fifteen or twenty cents.

Rogers and Winifred Woodruff Whitehouse (May 7, 1902 — December 24, 1989) met on November 10, 1923, at a Harvard-Princeton football game. They were married on February 28, 1924, in New York. They had 5 children.

His most famous novel is The Red Right Hand, first published in 1945. The book sold fairly well and was reissued several times in paperback format. Besides that book, Rogers published hundreds of short stories and three other novels which were not as successful: Once in a Red Moon (1923), Lady With the Dice (1946), and The Stopped Clock (1958, reissued as Never Leave My Bed in 1963).

In his later years, Rogers suffered several strokes and was forced to move to a nursing home in Washington, D.C., where he died on October 1, 1984, aged 87.

References

External links

1896 births
1984 deaths
20th-century American novelists
American male novelists
American mystery writers
American science fiction writers
Harvard University alumni
People from Sedalia, Missouri
Novelists from Missouri
American male short story writers
20th-century American short story writers
20th-century American male writers